Pasquale Amato (21 March 1878 – 12 August 1942) was an Italian operatic baritone. Amato enjoyed an international reputation but attained the peak of his fame in New York City, where he sang with the Metropolitan Opera from 1908 until 1921.

Early career
Amato was born in Naples and studied locally at the Conservatory of San Pietro a Majella under Beniamino Carelli and Vincenzo Lombardo (who also gave singing lessons to the great Neapolitan tenor Enrico Caruso). In 1900, he made his debut at the Teatro Bellini in Naples as Germont père in La traviata. Engagements followed in Genoa and Rome. Over the next few years he sang in Monte Carlo, Germany, parts of eastern Europe and Argentina. In 1904, he appeared at London's Royal Opera House with the Teatro di San Carlo Company; although well-received, he was not invited back.

He was engaged by La Scala, Milan, and sang there in 1907 under the baton of Arturo Toscanini. His voice had matured by now into a top-class instrument and he was praised for his versatility and artistic integrity. In 1913 he was accorded the honour of taking part in the Verdi centenary commemoration at the Busseto Theatre. He appeared at the commemoration in La traviata and Falstaff with Toscanini conducting. Other important operatic roles which Amato sang in Italy prior to World War I included Amonasro in Aida, Marcello in La bohème, the title part in Rigoletto, as well as Golaud in Pelléas et Mélisande, Kurwenal in Tristan und Isolde, Scarpia in Tosca and Barnaba in La Gioconda.

New York
Amato repeated some of these roles at the Metropolitan Opera, where Toscanini had gone to conduct and where Amato made his debut in 1908. He maintained a taxing performance schedule at the Met until he left the company in 1921, appearing in a number of operatic works that he had not undertaken before. In 1910, for example, he sang in Gluck's Armide, along with Enrico Caruso,  Olive Fremstad,  Louise Homer and Alma Gluck. In December of that same year, he created the part of Jack Rance in the Met's world premiere of  Puccini's La fanciulla del West, singing opposite Caruso, Emmy Destinn, Dinh Gilly and Antonio Pini-Corsi.

Amato was by now a celebrity, and his return to the United States by ship in October 1912 with fellow baritones Titta Ruffo, Antonio Scotti and William Hinshaw, and soprano Lucrezia Bori, received extensive  press coverage.

In 1913, Amato created the title role in Cyrano by Walter Damrosch; Frances Alda and Riccardo Martin were also in the cast. He performed, too, in that year's production of Un ballo in maschera with Caruso, Destinn, Margaret Matzenauer and Frieda Hempel, and with them again in Arrigo Boito's Mefistofele. In La Gioconda, he sang alongside Destinn again, and Margarethe Arndt-Ober. Amato was especially admired as Escamillo in Bizet's Carmen, supporting Geraldine Farrar, Caruso and Alda, when the opera was successfully revived in 1914.

Also in 1914, he performed the part of Manfredo (opposite Adamo Didur and Lucrezia Bori) in Montemezzi's L'amore dei tre re, when that new work came to New York, and in 1915 he created the part of Napoléon in Umberto Giordano's Madame Sans-Gêne, with Farrar as Catherine. In 1916, he gave the premiere American performance of the role of Giovanni in Riccardo Zandonai's Francesca da Rimini (opposite Alda and Giovanni Martinelli), and in 1918 that of Gianetto (with Farrar, Caruso, and Didur) in Mascagni's Lodoletta.

Amato's punishingly busy schedule at the Met took its toll on his voice and his health in general. He retired to Italy during the 1920s,  to relax and recuperate, but in 1933, 25 years after his American debut, he appeared there again at the New York Hippodrome, singing the role of the elder Germont in La Traviata.  Amato had an affinity with America and, in 1935, he accepted the position of Head of Studies in voice and opera at the Louisiana State University, where in 1939 he was initiated as an honorary member of the Beta Omega chapter of Phi Mu Alpha Sinfonia fraternity, the national fraternity for men in music. He died at the age of 64 in Jackson Heights, Queens.

Appraisal

Amato in his prime possessed a superb high baritone voice of wide compass. According to Michael Scott in The Record of Singing, it had a ringing and a unique vibrant tone that could not be confused with that produced by any other baritone. Although it was not quite so opulent as the vocal instrument possessed by his famous contemporary Titta Ruffo, it was still wonderfully resonant and secure, with plenty of carrying power and flexibility. Amato also sang with masterful phrasing and cantabile. In short: he was one of the most distinctive singers of his age.

Recordings
Amato made a number of extremely impressive  operatic recordings in America for the Victor Talking Machine Company—including some duets with Caruso, Johanna Gadski and other stars of the Met. His 1914 Victor recording of "Eri tu" (from Un Ballo in Maschera), for example, is considered by many critics to be the finest version of the aria ever committed to disc.

Prior to his contract with Victor, Amato had made a series of discs in Italy for Fonotipia, which included operatic arias and a remarkably intimate "A Sirena" (a Neapolitan song). Later, in 1924, he made an obscure (and poorly recorded) group of records for the Homophone company. He made just one known electrical recording—a "Neapolitan Song" produced by the Vitaphone company in 1927. Both sound only and motion-picture versions of the song have recently surfaced. Amato also appeared as a straight actor in a Warner Bros. motion picture, playing Napoléon in 1928's mostly-silent film Glorious Betsy.

Awards
As well as receiving honours from the Italian government, Amato was initiated as an honorary member of the Beta Omega chapter of Phi Mu Alpha Sinfonia, at Louisiana State University in 1939.

Notes

Sources
 A. Eaglefield-Hull, A Dictionary of Modern Music and Musicians (Dent, London 1924).
 G. Kobbé, The Complete Opera Book (Putnam, London 1935 printing).
 H. Rosenthal and J. Warrack, The Concise Oxford Dictionary of Opera (OUP, London 1974 printing).
 M. Scott, The Record of Singing Volume I (Duckworth, London 1977).
 J.B. Steane, The Grand Tradition (Duckworth, London, 1974).

External links

 Biographical notes
 1911 recording of "Largo al factotum" from The Barber of Seville
 "Modern Vocal Methods in Italy", in Great singers on the art of Singing, Harriette Brower, James Francis Cooke (eds.), 1996, Courier Dover Publications, Mineola, New York, 

1878 births
1942 deaths
Italian operatic baritones
Musicians from Naples
Louisiana State University faculty
Italian emigrants to the United States
Fonotipia Records artists